Sound Devices is an American corporation headquartered in Reedsburg, Wisconsin, with additional offices in Madison, Wisconsin and Berlin, Germany. Sound Devices designs and manufactures professional audio and video equipment.

History
The company was founded in 1998 by Matt Anderson, Jon Tatooles, and Jim Koomar who previously worked for Shure. The company specializes in portable equipment for location sound and video recording.

Sound Devices products have been used for many well-known films, including Birdman and Batman: The Dark Knight, and TV shows, including Doctor Who and Breaking Bad

In 2018 Sound Devices announced the acquisition of Audio Limited, a UK manufacturer of wireless microphone systems.

In October, 2021, Sound Devices was acquired by the Audiotonix Group.

Awards

Audio Products
 Multi-winner of the Cinema Audio Society Technical Achievement Award - 744T, 788T, 664,  633, and MixPre-10T (nominated in 2015 for the 970)
 NAMM Tec Award nominee in Outstanding Technical Achievement category (2014) - 970 recorder
 Resolution Magazine Award (2009) - 788T recorder

Video Products
 2014 SVC Innovative Product Award (2014) - PIX 270i
 Videomaker Best Products Award (2014) for Best Field Mixer - PIX 240i

References

External links
Company website

Manufacturers of professional audio equipment
Companies established in 1998
Companies based in Wisconsin
Reedsburg, Wisconsin
Audio equipment manufacturers of the United States